Epichoristodes imbriculata is a species of moth of the family Tortricidae. It is found in the Democratic Republic of Congo.

References

Archipini
Moths described in 1938
Moths of Africa
Taxa named by Edward Meyrick
Endemic fauna of the Democratic Republic of the Congo